Raymond Howard Kemp (April 7, 1907 – March 26, 2002) was an American football player and a charter member of the Pittsburgh Pirates football team (now called the Pittsburgh Steelers). He was also the first African-American player in the team's history. In fact in 1933, he was the only African-American on the team and only one of two black players in the entire National Football League.

Early life
Kemp graduated from Cecil High School in 1926. After graduation, he worked in the coal mines around Cecil, Pennsylvania for one year before enrolling at Duquesne University.

Duquesne Dukes
At Duquesne, Kemp was coached by Elmer Layden, a former member of Notre Dame's Four Horsemen (and later the commissioner of the NFL). Kemp became a starter for the Dukes during his sophomore year and by the end of his senior season, he received an honorable mention on some All-American lists. After graduation, Future Pirates owner, Art Rooney told Kemp that he would like for him to play for his "J.P. Rooney semi-pro team". In 1932 he did play for both the J.P. Rooneys and the semi-pro Erie Pros in his spare time. He remained at Duquesne that season, and served as the line coach under Layden.

Pittsburgh Pirates
The following year, the J.P. Rooneys were reorganized and became the NFL's Pittsburgh Pirates. Kemp joined the team and became one of only two black players in the league, the other being Joe Lillard of the Chicago Cardinals. Kemp played in the Pirates' first three games against, the New York Giants, Chicago Cardinals and Boston Redskins. After the Redskins game, Kemp was cut by the team. He appealed the cut to Art Rooney, but Rooney refused to go over the head of the coach, Jap Douds, who as a player-coach, also played Kemp's position. However a Pittsburgh Courier story on November 14, 1933 claimed that Kemp was placed on the reserve list and quit, although fans had rated him highly. Art Rooney stated that he was limited to having only 22 players on the roster and preferred to keep the more experienced players.

Kemp then went back to his job in the steel mill and the Pirates went 2–5 over the next seven games. He was named to the starting lineup after only two days of practice and played the entire game at tackle against the New York Giants, who would defeat the Pirates 27-3 at the Polo Grounds. However, the Friday before the Pirates' game in New York, Kemp was asked to leave the hotel housing the Pirates' players. Walter Francis White of the National Association for the Advancement of Colored People, suggested he file a discrimination suit. However Kemp refused, fearing the backlash that would occur to Art Rooney, who had given him a chance at an NFL career. That game against the Giants was the final game of Kemp's brief career in the NFL. The next season, he was hired as the head football coach at Bluefield State College.

With the exits of Kemp and Lillard, the NFL would not have any black players until 1946.

Post career
One of the highlights of Ray Kemp's post-football career came when he stood on the Steelers' sideline before a game at Three Rivers Stadium in 1982. The Steelers were celebrating their 50th anniversary and Kemp was a member of their first team in 1933. Kemp was the last surviving member of the Pirates/Steelers inaugural roster of 1933, having outlived teammate John Letsinger by slightly less than two months.

References

External links
 

1907 births
2002 deaths
American football tackles
Bluefield State Big Blues football coaches
Duquesne Dukes football players
Lincoln Blue Tigers athletic directors
Lincoln Blue Tigers football coaches
Lincoln Blue Tigers men's basketball coaches
Pittsburgh Pirates (football) players
College men's track and field athletes in the United States
People from Washington County, Pennsylvania
Sportspeople from the Pittsburgh metropolitan area
Coaches of American football from Pennsylvania
Players of American football from Pennsylvania
Basketball coaches from Pennsylvania
Track and field athletes from Pennsylvania
African-American coaches of American football
African-American players of American football
African-American basketball coaches
African-American college athletic directors in the United States
African-American track and field athletes
20th-century African-American sportspeople
21st-century African-American people